Gueutteville is a commune in the Seine-Maritime department in the Normandy region in northern France.

Geography
The A29 autoroute passes through the southern section of the commune's territory.

Population

Places of interest
 The church of Notre-Dame, dating from the thirteenth century.
 An eighteenth-century château.

See also
Communes of the Seine-Maritime department

References

Communes of Seine-Maritime